"It Only Hurts When I Cry" is a song co-written by American country music artists Dwight Yoakam and Roger Miller, and recorded by Yoakam.  It was released in December 1991 as the fourth single from his album If There Was a Way.  It peaked at #7 in the United States, and at #4 in Canada.  This song was one of the last ones written by Miller before his 1992 death.
The song was covered by Raul Malo on his 2007 album After Hours.

Music video
The music video was directed by Piers Plowden, and is entirely in black and white.

Chart performance

Year-end charts

References

1991 singles
Dwight Yoakam songs
Songs written by Roger Miller
Songs written by Dwight Yoakam
Reprise Records singles
Song recordings produced by Pete Anderson
Black-and-white music videos
1990 songs